Christian Molbech (8 October 1783 – 23 June 1857) was a Danish historian, literary critic, writer, and theater director. He was a professor of literature at the University of Copenhagen and was  the founding   editor of Historisk Tidsskrift

Early life and education
Christian Molbech was born and raised at Sorø  on the island of Zealand in Denmark.
He was the son of professor at Sorø Academy Johan Christian Molbech (1744-1824) and his wife Louise Philippine Friederike Tübell (1760-1829). He graduated from Sorø Academy in 1802.

Career
Molbech was employed at the Royal Danish Library in 1804. He was thus never formally trained as a historian. In 1829 he succeeded Knud Lyne Rahbek as professor of literature at the University of Copenhagen. He also functioned as the director of the Royal Danish Theatre from 1830 to 1842.

In 1839 he participated in the founding of the  Danish Historical Society (Den danske historiske Forening).  In 1840,  he was founder and first editor of Historisk Tidsskrift, which is the oldest still published scientific historical journal in the world.

Molbech also wrote various philological works, including "The Danish Dictionary" (Dansk Ordbog) 1828–1833  and the "Danish Dialect Dictionary" (Dansk Dialektleksikon) 1833-1841. Om public Bibliotheker (1829) was a pioneering work in library science. 

Furthermore he wrote the "Historical Annals for Enlightenment and Education in the History of the North, specifically the History of Denmark"   (Historiske Aarbøger til Oplysning og Veiledning i Nordens, særdeles Danmarks Historie I-III)  in 3 volumes between 1845–1851, which was meant as a reference work for historians and which was groundbreaking in the establishment of the chronology of Danish history.

Personal life
Molbech met Johanne Christine Langberg (April 1793 - 24 July 1879) at  Bakkehuset in Copenhagen  which was owned by Knud Lyne Rahbek and his wife Kamma Rahbek. They married on 23 October 1820. She was the daughter of dispachør and later justitsråd Knud Engelbreth Langberg (1760-1833) and Birgitte Marie Jacobsen (c. 1769-1829). They were the parents of poet Christian Knud Frederik Molbech  (1821-1888).  

Christian Molbech was a member of the  Royal Danish Academy of Sciences and Letters and was made a Commander  First Class of the Order of the Dannebrog in 1853.
He died in Copenhagen and was buried at Sorø Gamle Kirkegård.

References

Other Sources
 Morten Borup (1954) Christian Molbech (Copenhagen: Rosenkilde & Bagger)

External links
Danish Biographical Encyclopedia, volume XI, 1. edition 1887-1905.

1783 births
1857 deaths
People from Sorø Municipality
Academic staff of the University of Copenhagen
Danish magazine editors
19th-century Danish historians
Danish literary critics
Danish male writers
Danish theatre managers and producers
Commanders First Class of the Order of the Dannebrog
Members of the Royal Danish Academy of Sciences and Letters